Spurius Furius Medullinus Fusus (died 453 BC) was a Roman politician in the 5th century BC, and was consul in 464 BC, and consul suffect in 453 BC.

Family
Medullinus was the brother of Publius Furius Medullinus Fusus, consul in 472 BC. The cognomina Medullinus Fusus has been reconstructed from multiple sources. Dionysius of Halicarnassus gives the praenomen Servius in place of Spurius. Medullinus was the father of Lucius Furius Medullinus (military tribune with consular power in 432, 425, and 420 BC).

Biography
In 464 BC, he was elected consul with Aulus Postumius Albus Regillensis. The two consuls led separate campaigns against the Aequi, Medullinus in Hernician territory. In an initial battle the Aequi were victorious, and the Roman forces led by Furius were besieged in their camp.  Later Furius led his troops in a sortie.  They burst forth from their besieged camp and attacked the Aequi.  The Roman attack initially succeeded, however the consul's brother Publius, (who had been consul in 472 BC and was serving as a legatus under his brother's command) led his forces too far from the main Roman force, and was cut off and killed.  This led the consul to pursue him, and Spurius Furius himself was wounded, and only just rescued from the enemy.  The Aequi besieged the Romans in their camp once again, and displayed the head of the consul's brother.  But then the proconsul Titus Quinctius Capitolinus Barbatus arrived with Latin and Hernican forces, and attacked the Aequian army.  The besieged Roman army again broke forth from the camp, and the Aequian army was soundly defeated.  The Roman forces led by Quinctius and Furius then assisted the other consul Postumius in driving a separate Aequian force from Roman territory.

In 453 BC a pestilence ravaged Rome. According to Dionysius of Halicarnassus, a Spurius Fusus (probably the consul of 464 BC), was made consul suffect to replace the consul Sextus Quinctilius Varus, who died from the pestilence. Medullinus also died of the pestilence later that year.

References

Modern sources

Ancient sources

Bibliography

Ancient authors
Dionysius of Halicarnassus in Romaike Archaiologia books 9 and 10.
 Titus Livius in Roman History book 3.

Modern authors
 

453 BC deaths
5th-century BC Roman consuls
Deaths from infectious disease
Medullinus, Spurius
Year of birth unknown